Guy H. Arseneault (born 11 May 1952 in Dalhousie, New Brunswick) was a member of the House of Commons of Canada from 1988 to 1997. He was a teacher by career.

Politics
Arseneault won election for the Liberal party in the 1988 and 1993 federal elections. His riding was the Restigouche electoral district, renamed in 1989 to Restigouche-Chaleur. Arseneault therefore served in the 34th and 35th Canadian Parliaments.

For the 1997 federal election, the ridings were restructured, and this time Arseneault campaigned at the Madawaska—Restigouche electoral district. However, Progressive Conservative candidate Jean F. Dubé won the riding. Arseneault left federal politics after this defeat.

On 9 June 2018, Arseneault became the official Liberal candidate for the 2018 New Brunswick provincial election held on 24 September in the riding of Campbellton-Dalhousie, which he won. He was re-elected in the 2020 provincial election.

Electoral record

Campbellton-Dalhousie

Madawaska-Restigouche

Restigouche-Chaleur

Restigouche

References

External links

1952 births
Living people
Liberal Party of Canada MPs
Members of the House of Commons of Canada from New Brunswick
New Brunswick Liberal Association MLAs
People from Restigouche County, New Brunswick
Canadian educators